The James automobile manufactured by the J& M Motor Car Company of Lawrenceburg, Indiana was produced from 1909 to 1911.

History 
H. K. James tested his first car, called a Model A, on April 2, 1909, on a 100-mile test run.  A reporter from Cycle and Automobile Trade Journal wrote that the James "will climb any ordinary hill with two or four passengers." The Model A was a high wheeler and cost between $700 and $800. Production was minimal, and in 1911 the company switched production to a larger car called the Dearborn. It lasted one year.

Models

See also 

 High Wheeler
 Brass Era Car

References 

Defunct motor vehicle manufacturers of the United States
Brass Era vehicles
1900s cars
Highwheeler
Vehicle manufacturing companies established in 1909
Vehicle manufacturing companies disestablished in 1911
Motor vehicle manufacturers based in Indiana
Cars introduced in 1909